Billy McGhie may refer to:

Billy McGhie (footballer, born 1958), Scottish professional footballer
Billy McGhie (footballer, born 1961), Scottish professional footballer and manager